Kamoke is a Tehsil of Gujranwala District located on the Grand Trunk Road. It is headquartered at Kāmoke, which is approximately 24 km from Gujranwala - the district capital. It is famous for its market of Basmati rice. It is administratively subdivided into twenty four Union Councils.

Kamoke is a bustling town located on the GT road. Most inhabitants are Arae, Butts, Dars, Jats, Gujjars, Mughals, Momin Ansari, Rahmani Maliks, Rajputs Rana Arslan, (Pathans are also influential)  and depend on agriculture. It is famous for its rice and burfy (a local sweet).
This area is attached to many villages and suburbs that are holding vast swathes of agricultural land. Almost all kind of vegetable are grown here as per the regional and climatic conditions. 
Rural vicinities are also well known for producing the dairy products that include milk, butter and other related products.

Political Situation
In terms of political leadership, unfortunately however this region has not got any sincere representative who could truly think of the problems and difficulties faced by general masses.
Culture of politics till date revolves around family politics and tribe loyalty instead of vision-based.
Even in recent general elections of 2018, people preferred the same family and caste politics and elected the year old tested and in-effective political leadership. However with the new government in the provincial assembly, there is chance of seeing a positive local bodies governing system.

Union councils
The names of the Union councils are as follows:
 Sadhoke
 Wahndo
 Akbar Ghanoke
 Chak Ramdas
 Dhensar Paind
 Ghaniaan
 Ghoman
 Gunnaur 
 Kali Suba
 Kamoke Town Urban-I (Ahmad Raza Bajwa)
 Kamoke Town Urban-II
 Kamoke Town Urban-III
 Kamoke Town Urban-IV
 Kamoke Town Urban-V
 Kamoke Town Urban-VI
 Kamoke Town Urban-VII (Khan Town)
 Kamoke Town Urban-VIII
DARGAPUR

 Kotli Nawab
 Machhrala
 Majju Chak
 Mandiala Tega
 Mari Thakran (Mustafa Abad)
 Nangal Doona Singh
 Sohawa

References

Gujranwala District
Tehsils of Punjab, Pakistan

leader:Raees iqbal dar Advocate High court Shamshad Ahmad khan marhom, Rana Umar nazir khan MPA 99, Rana nazir khan, Ch Ashraf Ali Ansari ex Nazim UC 163/8, Currently MPA PP-93.